Karim Abdel Gawad (born July 30, 1991, in Alexandria) is a professional squash player who has represented Egypt. He reached a career-high world ranking of World No. 1 in May  2017.

In November 2016, he won the 2016 World Open Squash Championship in Cairo in Egypt against Ramy Ashour. He became the third Egyptian to win the World Championship after Amr Shabana and Ramy Ashour.

World Open final appearances

1 title & 0 runner-up

Major World Series final appearances

Qatar Classic: 1 finals (1 title, 0 runner-up)

Hong Kong Open: 1 finals (0 title, 1 runner-up)

Al-Ahram International: 1 final (1 title, 0 runner-up)

References

External links 
 
 

1991 births
Living people
Egyptian male squash players
Sportspeople from Alexandria